Bryan Kennedy may refer to:

Bryan Kennedy, founder of Mobmov
Bryan Kennedy (politician), candidate in United States House of Representatives elections, 2004
Bryan Kennedy (songwriter) on Mark Twain: Words & Music

See also
Brian Kennedy (disambiguation)